Germany participated in the Eurovision Song Contest 2004 with the song "Can't Wait Until Tonight" written by Stefan Raab. The song was performed by Max. The German entry for the 2004 contest in Istanbul, Turkey was selected through the national final Germany 12 Points!, organised by the German broadcaster ARD in collaboration with Norddeutscher Rundfunk (NDR). The national final took place on 19 March 2004 and featured ten competing acts with the winner being selected through two rounds of public voting. "Can't Wait Until Tonight" performed by Max was selected as the German entry for Istanbul after placing first in the top two during the first round of voting and ultimately gaining 92% of the vote in the second round.

As a member of the "Big Four", Germany automatically qualified to compete in the final of the Eurovision Song Contest. Performing in position 8, Germany placed eighth out of the 24 participating countries with 93 points.

Background 

Germany has won the contest on one occasion: in 1982 with the song "Ein bißchen Frieden" performed by Nicole. Germany, to this point, has been noted for having competed in the contest more than any other country; they have competed in every contest since the first edition in 1956 except for the 1996 contest when the nation was eliminated in a pre-contest elimination round. In 2003, the German entry "Let's Get Happy" performed by Lou placed eleventh out of twenty-six competing songs scoring 53 points.

The German national broadcaster, ARD, broadcasts the event within Germany and delegates the selection of the nation's entry to the regional broadcaster Norddeutscher Rundfunk (NDR). NDR confirmed that Germany would participate in the 2004 Eurovision Song Contest on 19 May 2003. Since 1996, NDR had set up national finals with several artists to choose both the song and performer to compete at Eurovision for Germany. On 26 September 2003, the broadcaster also announced that they would organise a multi-artist national final in cooperation with private music channel VIVA to select the German entry, with the goal of finding songs that have international hit potential instead of those "which do not stand a chance to chart in Germany or abroad and which rather burdened the image of the Eurovision Song Contest in the past."

Before Eurovision

Germany 12 Points! 
Germany 12 Points! was the competition that selected Germany's entry for the Eurovision Song Contest 2004. The competition took place on 19 March 2004 at the Treptow Arena in Berlin, hosted by Sarah Kuttner and Jörg Pilawa. Ten acts competed during the show with the winner being selected through a public televote. The show was broadcast on Das Erste as well as online via the broadcaster's Eurovision Song Contest website eurovision.de. The national final was watched by 5.71 million viewers in Germany.

Competing entries 
Nine of the ten artists were nominated by representatives of VIVA from proposals received from record companies. Only artists that had released at least one professional music video on VIVA were eligible to compete. The nine participating acts were announced starting from 12 January 2004 during the VIVA programme Euroclash and Max Mutzke was announced as the tenth act on 2 March 2004 following his victory at the ProSieben talent show SSDSGPS as well as his success in the German Top 40 singles charts during early 2004.

Final 
The televised final took place on 19 March 2004. The winner was selected through two rounds of public voting, including options for landline and SMS voting. In the first round of voting, the top two entries were selected to proceed to the second round. The top two entries were: "Can't Wait Until Tonight" performed by Max and "Jigga Jigga!" performed by Scooter. In the second round, the winner, "Can't Wait Until Tonight" performed by Max, was selected. In addition to the performances of the competing entries, Turkish singer Mustafa Sandal performed his song "Araba", while the German group Rosenstolz performed their song "Liebe ist alles" and the Australian music ensemble The Ten Tenors performed a medley of songs written by Ralph Siegel, who had previously composed 17 Eurovision entries for various countries. 927,418 votes were cast in the second round: 766,615 via landline and 154,863 via SMS.

Controversy 
Following the German national final, show host Sarah Kuttner stated that she and her co-host Jörg Pilawa did not get along very well as he had taken over some of her lines without telling her, which led to confusion during the live broadcast. Pilawa could also been seen doing faces when Kuttner announced contestant Tina Frank. Later during a green room scene, Kuttner ironically stated "When I am older, I will marry Jörg Pilawa. Jörg, I love you from the bottom of my heart." She was also criticised for using the German words for "crap" and "shit" during the live broadcast, which usually does not happen on a public channel.

Chart release and success 
Like every year since 1996, a compilation CD with all entries was released. The CD also included the song "Right Here" by Masha, which was one of the eligible entries for the national final but ultimately was not selected as it failed to reach the German Top 40 single charts, as well as the winning song of the 2003 Eurovision Song Contest "Everyway That I Can" by Sertab Erener.

For the first time ever, all songs in the CD managed to reach the German singles charts, with some also making it to the singles charts in Austria and Switzerland. Max became one of four German representatives to top the singles charts since Nicole in 1982, while national final runner-up "Jigga Jigga!" by Scooter reached the singles charts in Norway (#10), Finland (#21), Sweden (#24), Ireland (#34), the United Kingdom (#48) and the Netherlands (#50).

At Eurovision 
According to Eurovision rules, all nations with the exceptions of the host country and the "Big Four" (France, Germany, Spain and the United Kingdom) are required to qualify from the semi-final in order to compete for the final; the top ten countries from the semi-final progress to the final. As a member of the "Big 4", Germany automatically qualified to compete in the final on 21 May 2005. In addition to their participation in the final, Germany is also required to broadcast and vote in the semi-final. The running order for the final in addition to the semi-final was decided through an allocation draw, and Germany was subsequently drawn to perform in position eight, following Netherlands and preceding Albania. At the conclusion of the final during which Max performed the song in English and Turkish, Germany placed eighth in the final, scoring 93 points.

In Germany, the two shows were broadcast on Das Erste which featured commentary by Peter Urban, as well as on Deutschlandfunk and NDR 2 which featured commentary by Thomas Mohr. The German spokesperson, who announced the top 12-point score awarded by the German televote during the final, was Thomas Anders.

Voting 
Below is a breakdown of points awarded to Germany and awarded by Germany in the semi-final and grand final of the contest, and the breakdown of the voting conducted during the two shows. Germany awarded its 12 points to Serbia and Montenegro in the semi-final and to Turkey in the grand final of the contest.

Points awarded to Germany

Points awarded by Germany

References 

2004
Countries in the Eurovision Song Contest 2004
Eurovision
Eurovision